Kristian August Østby (29 January 1900 – 11 June 1981) was a Norwegian naval aviator.

Early years
Østby attended the Norwegian Naval Flying School from 1924, graduating in 1925. He soon became an instructor, then test pilot at Marinens Flyvebaatfabrikk.

Military career

World War II
The Marinens Flyvebaatfabrikk M.F.12 (sometimes known as the Høver M.F.12, after its designer) was a seaplane built in Norway in 1939 as a military trainer aircraft to replace the Royal Norwegian Navy Air Service's aging fleet of M.F.8 trainers. In 1939, Østby was the factory's control officer and also responsible for introducing the Heinkel He 115 torpedo bombers ordered by the RNNAS.

With Captain Birger Motzfeldt of the Norwegian Army Air Service, Østby was instrumental in the purchase of aircraft from the United States just prior to the German invasion of Norway in 1940. Norway had recognised that the equipment of its armed forces was obsolete, and sent a purchasing commission to the United States in February 1940, including a Royal Norwegian Navy Air Service contingent headed by Cmdr. Østby. Amongst the requirements the commission hoped to fill was to replace the Royal Norwegian Navy Air Service's M.F.11 biplane patrol aircraft.

After visits to many of the aviation companies, Østby determined that only one manufacturer had both a design, company designation Model 8-A and available production capacity, Northrop Aircraft Incorporated. He supervised all the final fitting of equipment and participated in the flight testing of the N-3PDs at Lake Elsinore, California.

When the final N-3PD production run was completed in March 1941, Østby was appointed air attaché to the Norwegian embassy in Washington. After arriving in the United Kingdom, the Norwegian government-in-exile began the process of setting up a new base of operations. A decision was swiftly made to keep the existing Norwegian pilots that had escaped to the United Kingdom, as an independent unit, consequently, none were allowed to participate in the Battle of Britain. Østby worked with Bernt Balchen, a Norwegian aviator, who enlisted with the Royal Norwegian Air Force and had come to the United States on a crucial mission to negotiate "matters pertaining to aircraft ordnance and ammunition with the question of the Norwegian government's possible purchase of such materials in the United States of America."

The Norwegian Government-in-exile in London changed to a new directive: to set up a training camp and school for expatriate Norwegian airmen and soldiers in Canada and Østby was one of the principal "architects" of the training program, helping to negotiate with Canadian government officials to obtain an agreement to use available airport facilities in Canada. Arrangements were made to transfer Norwegian pilots to a North American headquarters while various locations were considered, a base around the Toronto Island Airport in Canada was chosen. Once the base known as "Little Norway" was established, young Norwegians migrated to the site to enroll in the RNoAF in Canada.

Postwar
After the war Østby served in the Royal Norwegian Air Force in several technical positions, among others as director of Horten flyfabrikk and Kjeller Flyfabrikk. Østby retired from the Royal Norwegian Air Force in 1963 as a colonel.

References

Notes

Bibliography

 Beaucamp, Gerry. "The Hawks of Norway."  Air Classics, Volume 12, No. 1, January 1976.
 Beaucamp, Gerry and Annika Richert. "Norwegian Warriors."  Air Classics, Volume 14, No. 2, February 1978.
 Bishop, Chris. "The Encyclopedia of Weapons of World War II". New York: Sterling Publishing Company, 2002. .
 Glines, Carroll V. Bernt Balchen: Polar Aviator. Washington, D.C.: Smithsonian Books, 1999. .
 Green, William. War Planes of the Second World War: Volume Six, Floatplanes. London: Macdonald, 1962. 
 Hafsten, Bjørn and Tom Arheim. Marinens Flygevåpen 1912–1944  (in Norwegian). Oslo: TankeStreken AS, 2003. . 
 Hansen, Conradi. Little Norway: A Message of Liberty to the Hills of Home. Oslo, Norway: Military Historical Foundation of Eastern Norway, 1985. .
 Henriksen, Vera. Luftforsvarets historie bind 2 (in Norwegian) Oslo: H. Aschehoug & Co (W Nygaard), 1996. .
 "Hvem er hvem (Norwegian Who's who)." runeberg.org, 1973.
 March, Daniel J. British Warplanes of World War II. London: Aerospace Publishing, 1998. .
 Taylor, Michael J. H. Jane's Encyclopedia of Aviation. London: Studio Editions, 1989. .

1900 births
1981 deaths
Norwegian aviators
Royal Norwegian Navy Air Service personnel of World War II
Royal Norwegian Air Force personnel of World War II
Norwegian military attachés